Rafael Loreto Mea Vitali (born 17 February 1975, in Caracas) is a Venezuelan football defender who made a total number of 11 appearances for the Venezuela national team between 2001 and 2002.

Club career
He started his professional career at Caracas FC and actually coaches for CIEX Sports Academy.

References

External links

1975 births
Living people
Footballers from Caracas
Venezuelan footballers
Venezuela international footballers
2001 Copa América players
Association football defenders
Caracas FC players
New Jersey Stallions players
SV Waldhof Mannheim players
Sportfreunde Siegen players
UA Maracaibo players
A.C.C.D. Mineros de Guayana players
Aragua FC players
Atlético Venezuela C.F. players
Venezuelan expatriate footballers
Expatriate footballers in Germany
Expatriate soccer players in the United States
Venezuelan expatriate sportspeople in Germany
Venezuelan expatriate sportspeople in the United States